Saliwangan railway station is one of eleven minor railway station on the Western Sabah Railway Line located in Saliwangan, Beaufort, Sabah, Malaysia.

References

External links 
 

Beaufort District
Railway stations opened in 1914
Railway stations in Sabah